During the Parade of Nations within the Tokyo 2020 Summer Olympics opening ceremony, which took place on 23 July 2021, athletes and officials from each participating team entered the Olympic Stadium preceded by their flag and placard bearer. Each flag bearer will have been chosen either by the team's National Olympic Committee or by the athletes themselves. For the first time, each team had the option to allow two flag bearers, one male and one female, in an effort to promote gender equality.
These Olympics were postponed from 2020 due to the COVID-19 pandemic. The number of athletes who paraded at this opening ceremony was much smaller than normal because of the new "2-week, 2-wave" system. First used at the 2020 Winter Youth Olympics, the athletes who competed in the first week marched at the opening ceremony, while those scheduled for the second week paraded at the closing ceremony.

Parade order
As the originator of the Olympics, the Greek team entered first, followed by the IOC Refugee Olympic Team, composed of refugees from several countries. The United States entered antepenultimately as the host of Los Angeles 2028, France entered penultimately as the host of Paris 2024, and finally the host nation Japan entered last. Despite Australia had recently been awarded as the host of Brisbane 2032 exactly 11 years to this day, Australia entered its natural position in the Japanese language order between El Salvador and Austria. All other teams entered in between in  order, based on the names of countries in Japanese.  The names of the teams were announced in French, English, and Japanese, the official languages of the Olympic movement and the host nation, in accordance with Olympic Charter and International Olympic Committee (IOC) guidelines.

The Republic of North Macedonia had previously competed under the provisional name of Former Yugoslav Republic of Macedonia, because of the disputed status of its official name. It was officially renamed to North Macedonia in February 2019 and the Olympic Committee of North Macedonia (NMOC) was officially adopted in February 2020. It was North Macedonia's first appearance at the Summer Olympics under its new name.

Several of the nations marched under their formal Japanese names. For example, the Great Britain delegation marched under the formal name  ("United Kingdom") rather than the better known informal , and China's delegation marched under  ("People's Republic of China") instead of the more common .

Teams and flagbearers
On 4 March 2020, the IOC announced that each team can have the option to allow two flag bearers, one male and one female, in an effort to promote gender equality.

Below is a list of parading teams and their announced flag bearer(s), in the same order as the parade. This is sortable by team name, flag bearer's name, and flag bearer's sport. This was the first time the Parade of Nations was conducted in Japanese order.

Notes

Taiwan (Chinese Taipei)'s parade entrance
However, it would have done this regardless of special ordering, as Chinese Taipei has paraded under "T" or its equivalent in every Parade of Nations language other than Chinese (including, for example, PyeongChang 2018 and Seoul 1988).

NHK, the opening ceremony's official Japanese broadcaster, also specially commented "It's Taiwan!" after the stadium announcers finished announcing the name "Chinese Taipei", which also received attention from Taiwanese media.

Music
Musical pieces for the Parade of Nations were selected from several video game soundtracks created in Japan. These selections included themes from Square Enix's Dragon Quest, Final Fantasy, SaGa, Nier, Chrono Trigger, and Kingdom Hearts, Bandai Namco's Tales series, Soulcalibur, and Ace Combat, Capcom's Monster Hunter, Konami's Pro Evolution Soccer and Gradius, and Sega Sammy's Sonic the Hedgehog and Phantasy Star.

See also
 2020 Summer Paralympics Parade of Nations
 1964 Summer Olympics Parade of Nations, also in Tokyo, Japan.
 1998 Winter Olympics Parade of Nations

References

External links
 

2020 Summer Olympics
Lists of Olympic flag bearers
Parades in Japan